The Healdsburg Tribune is a weekly newspaper covering the community of Healdsburg, California and the surrounding areas. It began publication March 21, 1888 as the Sonoma County Tribune, with Isidore Abraham listed as Editor and Louis Meyer as Associate Editor. It has changed titles several times since.

The nonprofit Sonoma County Local News Initiative announced the Tribune's shutdown on April 28, 2022, and it was subsequently rescued by the owners of the North Bay Bohemian, the Weeklys publishing group. It continued publication on schedule on May 5, 2022. “We are surprised, gratified and a little astonished,” said Nancy Dobbs, president of the board of directors of Sonoma County Local News Initiative, which sold the newspaper's assets to Weeklys.

Related titles include the Healdsburg Enterprise (1876-1929), Healdsburg Tribune (1919-1937), and Sotoyome Scimitar (1908-1946).

See also
Healdsburg Enterprise

References

External links
Healdsburg Tribune
California Digital Newspaper Collection

1888 establishments in California
Healdsburg, California
Mass media in Sonoma County, California